The Sea Mystery is a 1928 detective novel by Freeman Wills Crofts. It is the fourth in a series of novels featuring Inspector French of Scotland Yard. As with a number of his works Crofts creates a puzzling mystery which French is then able to solve using a Tide table and Bradshaw's Guide to the railways. The plot has some similarities with his debut novel The Cask (1920).

Synopsis
French of Scotland Yard is called in when a fisherman discovers a crate containing a battered body on the cost of South Wales. His investigations eventually take him to Devon.

References

Bibliography
 Carter, Ian. Railways and Culture in Britain: The Epitome of Modernity. Manchester University Press, 2001.
 Evans, Curtis. Masters of the "Humdrum" Mystery: Cecil John Charles Street, Freeman Wills Crofts, Alfred Walter Stewart and the British Detective Novel, 1920-1961. McFarland, 2014.
 Herbert, Rosemary. Whodunit?: A Who's Who in Crime & Mystery Writing. Oxford University Press, 2003.
 Reilly, John M. Twentieth Century Crime & Mystery Writers. Springer, 2015.

1928 British novels
Novels by Freeman Wills Crofts
British crime novels
British mystery novels
British thriller novels
British detective novels
William Collins, Sons books
Novels set in London
Novels set in Devon
Novels set in Wales